A cue sheet may refer to:

 Cue sheet (computing), a text file that details the layout of tracks on a compact disc 
 A list of theatrical cues with timing and volume/intensity information
 The Cue Sheet, the quarterly journal of The Film Music Society

See also
Cue (disambiguation)